Bud Boogie Beach was a small water park located on Mud Island in Memphis, Tennessee. It opened in 1987 and closed in 1997.  

Bud Boogie Beach included a beach, concession stands, a New Orleans-style restaurant and several games including Water basketball and water volleyball.  The park featured live music concerts, which included many local musicians.

It was open from Memorial Day weekend through Labor Day weekend each year.

Other attractions included two-person peddle boats and a kiddie area.

History
The Mud Island Park was constructed with a scaled model of the entire Mississippi River that runs the length of the park.  At the end of the scaled version is replica of the Gulf of Mexico.  Originally designed as an area in which patrons could ride manual paddle boats, the success of the Adventure River waterpark led Mud Island officials to convert the Gulf area into a small waterpark.

Corporate sponsor
Budweiser was the primary sponsor of the park and purchased the right to name the park Bud Boogie Beach.

Closing
Bud Boogie Beach was closed due to a variety of reasons.  The swimming area was far from the parking area, making the carrying of beach bags and floats difficult; the area was not built as a swimming pool, so the mixing of chlorine was done manually and was uneven. 

The Mud Island River Park and museum are still open.  Bud Boogie Beach is the only closed attraction at the park.

References

1987 establishments in Tennessee
1997 disestablishments in Tennessee
Defunct amusement parks in the United States

Landmarks in Tennessee
Buildings and structures in Memphis, Tennessee
Water parks in Tennessee